Susan Cummings (born Gerda Susanne Tafel; July 10, 1930 – December 3, 2016) was a German-American actress active from the 1940s to 1960s, who started as a teenager in the earliest days of commercial television, and appeared in several television shows and feature films, and on Broadway. Her Tafel birth surname was sometimes printed as Ta Fel.

Early years 
Born Gerda Susanne Tafel in Bavaria, Germany, she immigrated to the United States at age 7 on March 12, 1938, shortly before the outbreak of World War II. The daughter of Mr. and Mrs. Eugene Tafel, she grew up in Newark, New Jersey, where her father ran a bakery.

Career 
Cummings (billed as Suzanne Tafel) was a teenager when she was a regular on the American television variety series At Home, which aired on pioneering New York City television station WCBW (now WCBS-TV) from 1944 to 1945, in the earliest years of commercial television. She first appeared in Broadway theatre in 1945, portraying Susan Peters in Carousel.

During the 1958–59 season, Cummings portrayed Georgia, proprietress of the Golden Nugget Saloon, in the syndicated Western television series Union Pacific.

She made two guest appearances on Perry Mason — one as Lois Fenton in the title role in the 1957 episode, "The Case of the Fan Dancer's Horse", and as Margaret Swaine in the 1959 episode, "The Case of the Lame Canary".

In 1960, she appeared as Stella Carney, a love interest of Marshall Dillon's, in the TV Western series Gunsmoke in  "The Peace Officer".  She later appeared as Patty in the iconic 1962 episode of The Twilight Zone, "To Serve Man". 

In February of 1964, she appeared in the TV series, McHale's Navy, in the episode, "The Big Impersonation", as the character, Renee.

Personal life
In the late 1940s, Cummings was married to rodeo performer Wayne Dunafon. She married actor Keith Larsen on December 28, 1953, in Ensenada, Mexico. She was also married to actor Charles T. Pawley and accountant Robert E. Strasser.

According to Cummings, she was a registered Republican, and that growing up, she was raised Lutheran, but converted to Mormonism upon her marriage to Larsen.

Cummings died December 3, 2016.

Filmography

References

External links

 

1930 births
2016 deaths
American film actresses
American television actresses
American stage actresses
German emigrants to the United States
German film actresses
German television actresses
German stage actresses
American Latter Day Saints
Converts to Mormonism
Former Lutherans
20th-century American actresses
20th-century German actresses
Arizona Republicans
California Republicans
21st-century American women